Ermira Dingu is an Albanian shooter who represented her country in the 50m rifle prone women in the 1980 European Shooting Championships and became European Champion in the event. 6 years earlier, in 1974, she had been 6th in the World Championship, in the same event.

References

Living people
Year of birth missing (living people)
Albanian female sport shooters
European champions in shooting
European champions for Albania